Geoffrey Alexander (2 January 1921 – 15 June 1989) was a British television actor of the 1960s. He often played doctors or officers. Appearances include Z-Cars (1962), The Avengers (1963), Coronation Street (1963), The Man in Room 17 (1965), and The Strange Case of Dr. Jekyll and Mr. Hyde (1968).

References

External links 

British male television actors
1921 births
1989 deaths